The 2014 European Figure Skating Championships was a senior international figure skating competition in the 2013–14 season. The competition was held in Budapest, Hungary from January 13 to 19th, 2014. Skaters competed in the disciplines of men's singles, ladies' singles, pair skating, and ice dancing.

Records
For complete list of figure skating records, see list of highest scores in figure skating.

The following new ISU best scores were set during this competition:

Qualification
Skaters were eligible for the event if they were representing a European member nations of the International Skating Union and had reached the age of 15 before July 1, 2013 in their place of birth. The corresponding competition for non-European skaters was the 2014 Four Continents Championships. National associations selected their entries according to their own criteria but the ISU mandated that their selections achieve a minimum technical elements score (TES) at an international event prior to the European Championships.

Minimum TES

Number of entries per discipline
Based on the results of the 2013 European Championships, the ISU allowed each country one to three entries per discipline.

Entries
National associations began announcing their selections in mid-December 2013 and the ISU published a complete list on 28 December 2013:

Withdrew:
 Magdalena Klatka / Radosław Chruściński
 Nathalie Péchalat / Fabian Bourzat replaced by Gabriella Papadakis / Guillaume Cizeron
 Matthias Versluis replaced by Valtter Virtanen

Schedule

Results

Men

Ladies

Pairs
Tatiana Volosozhar and Maxim Trankov set a new world record for the short program (83.98 points).

Ice dancing

Medals summary

Medals by country
Table of medals for overall placement:

Table of small medals for placement in the short segment:

Table of small medals for placement in the free segment:

Medalists
Medals for overall placement:

Small medals for placement in the short segment:

Small medals for placement in the free segment:

References

External links
 Starting orders/results
 Entries
 International Skating Union

European Figure Skating Championships
European
European Figure Skating Championships
International sports competitions in Budapest
International figure skating competitions hosted by Hungary